The 1980–81 Gonzaga Bulldogs men's basketball team represented Gonzaga University in the West Coast Athletic Conference (WCAC) during the 1980–81 NCAA Division I men's basketball season. Led by 3rd season with head coach Dan Fitzgerald, the Bulldogs were  overall  and played their home games on campus at Kennedy Pavilion in Spokane, Washington.

A loss in the finale to Portland likely cost Gonzaga a berth in the National Invitation Tournament (NIT). A 1980 graduate of Gonzaga Prep, point guard John Stockton was a freshman this season.

After the season, athletic director Fitzgerald stepped down as head coach and promoted assistant coach Jay Hillock. Four years later, Fitzgerald returned as head coach, and led the Zags for an additional twelve seasons (fifteen total).

References

External links
Sports Reference – Gonzaga Bulldogs men's basketball – 1980-81 season

Gonzaga Bulldogs men's basketball seasons
Gonzaga
1980 in sports in Washington (state)
1981 in sports in Washington (state)